Juan Manuel Bajo Ulloa (born 1 January 1967) is a Spanish film director.

Biography 
Juanma Bajo Ulloa was born in Vitoria-Gasteiz, Álava, on 1 January 1967. His parents mortgaged their house to fund Bajo Ulloa's film beginnings. His first feature film  Alas de Mariposa (1991) earned the Golden Shell at the San Sebastián Film Festival. With the money earned with that movie he produced his second one, La Madre Muerta, which is a good example of his baroque style, combining a perfect technique with the atmosphere of an almost sinister fairy tale. His third movie, Airbag (1997), was a huge box office success, becoming the highest grossing film in the history of Spanish cinema (the record was beaten however a year later by Torrente, el brazo tonto de la ley).

Since 1994 he has directed and produced music videos for Joaquín Sabina, Los Enemigos, and Barricada, and others.

Filmography 

Feature films
 Alas de mariposa (1991)
  (1993)
 Airbag (1997)
  (2004)
  (2015)
 Baby (2020)
Short films
 Cruza la Puerta (1984) 
 El Último Payaso (1985) 1985
 A Kien Puede Interesar (1986) 1986
 Cien Aviones de Papel (1987) 1987
 Akixo (1988)
 El Reino de Víctor (1989)
 Ordinary Americans (1999)

 Awards and nominations 

 Award Opera Prima and Audience in the Seattle International Film Festival
 New York Film Critics Association Award to best Opera Prima.
 Best movie, Stockholm Film Festival for La Madre Muerta Best movie, Fantasporto (Portugal) for La Madre Muerta''

References 
Citations

Bibliography

External links 
 
 

1967 births
People from Vitoria-Gasteiz
Film directors from the Basque Country (autonomous community)
Spanish film directors
Living people